David Murray/James Newton Quintet is an album by David Murray and James Newton released on the Japanese DIW label in 1996. It features seven quintet performances by Murray and Newton with John Hicks, Fred Hopkins, Billy Hart and Andrew Cyrille.

Reception
The Allmusic review awarded the album 4 stars.

Track listing
 "Valerie" (Newton) - 7:20 
 "Moon Over Sand II" (Cyrille) - 5:34 
 "Muhammad Ali" - 7:44 
 "Inbetwinxt" (Newton) - 12:15 
 "Akhenaten" (Murray, Newton) - 4:23 
 "Blues In The Pocket" (Hicks) - 7:02 
 "Doni's Song" - 10:45 
All compositions by David Murray except as indicated
 Recorded August 19 & 20, 1991 at Sound on Sound, NYC

Personnel
David Murray - tenor saxophone, bass clarinet
James Newton - flute
John Hicks - piano
Fred Hopkins - bass
Andrew Cyrille - drums (all tracks but "Valerie")
Billy Hart - drums (on "Valerie" only)

References 

1996 albums
David Murray (saxophonist) albums
DIW Records albums